Origins

Anthony Throckmorton (Throgmorton) (1528 – 1592/93) was the son of Sir George Throckmorton of Coughton and his wife Katherine Vaux, the eldest daughter of Nicholas Vaux of Harrowden by his first wife Elizabeth FitzHugh. He was a member of Parliament for Cricklade in the parliament of 1563. He was a Roman Catholic and a recusant.

Marriage and issue

Anthony Throckmorton married Katherine Willington in Barchester, Warwickshire, England circa 1554. Anthony by his wife had at least four sons and five daughters as follows:

Sons

 Thomas Throckmorton (born 1555–1598).
 John Throckmorton, (born 1555).
 George Throckmorton, (born 1567–1612).
 Robert Throckmorton, (born 1569–1577).

Daughters

 Anne Throckmorton
 Mary Throckmorton (born 1556–1643), who married John Stratford of Farmcote, Gloucestershire. House of Stratford 
 Catherine Throckmorton (born 1558–1614).
 Margaret Throckmorton (born 1571).
 Elizabeth Throckmorton (born 1573–1636).

References 

Members of Parliament for Cricklade
English MPs 1563–1567
1590s deaths
1528 births
Year of death uncertain
English Roman Catholics
Recusants
Mercers
16th-century English businesspeople